Spanish clover is a common name for several flowering plants in the Fabaceae (pea) family and may refer to:

Acmispon americanus
Desmodium incanum, native to Central and South America
Lotus purshianus
Medicago sativa
Trifolium gemellum, a species of Trifolium